American Princess may refer to:

 American Princess (2005 TV series), an American reality competition 
 American Princess (2019 TV series), an American drama television series
 American Princess Cruises, an American ferry company in New Jersey and New York

See also
 List of American heiresses